Jason Richard Dourisseau (born December 7, 1983) is an American-born naturalised Dutch professional basketball player who plays for Aris Leeuwarden of the BNXT League. Dourisseau primarily plays the small forward position. Born in Omaha, Nebraska, Dourisseau received a Dutch passport in 2015. He is most known for his years with Donar, where he played for 10 seasons and won five DBL championships and seven other trophies. The club retired his number 8.

Professional career

In the 2006–07 season, Dourisseau started his career with Neckar Riesen Ludwigsburg. He reached the Basketball Bundesliga Finals with Ludwigsburg in his first season. In the 2007–08 season, he finished 12th with the team.

In the 2008–09 season, Dourisseau played with KR Basket of the Icelandic Úrvalsdeild karla. Over the season, Dourisseau averaged 16.7 points and 7.6 rebounds per game, while winning the Icelandic Championship and the Company Cup with KR.

For the 2009–10 season, Dourisseau signed with GasTerra Flames of the Dutch Basketball League (DBL). In his first season, he won the Dutch championship. In his second season, he played in the Euroleague qualifying rounds with Flames. The team was eliminated in the first preliminary round against Russian side UNICS. In the 2013–14 season, after Dourisseau won his second Dutch championship, GasTerra Flames announced that one of the stands in home arena MartiniPlaza would be named after him as the "Jason Dourisseau Tribune" (English: Jason Dourisseau Stand).

In the 2014 offseason, Dourisseau signed with s.Oliver Baskets of the ProA, the second tier of basketball in Germany.

On 21 July 2015, Dourisseau returned to Donar, by signing a 2-year deal with the club. In 2017, Dourisseau signed for three more seasons with Donar. He won his fifth DBL championship again in 2018. On 22 June 2020, Donar announced the club and Dourisseau were parting ways.

On October 23, 2021, Donar officially retired Dourisseau's number 8. He became just the second player to have his jersey retired at Donar, after Martin de Vries.

On March 1, 2023, Dourisseau came out of retirement at age 39 when he signed for Aris Leeuwarden for the remainder of the BNXT League season.

National team career
In anticipation of his upcoming Dutch passport, Dourisseau was in the pre-selection of the Dutch national basketball team, as he was selected by Toon van Helfteren on June 13, 2015. Dourisseau later received his passport and made his national team debut on July 15 in a friendly game against Germany. He went on to play four games for the Netherlands in that year.

Personal
In August 2015, Dourisseau officially became a Dutch citizen. He married his wife Renate, who he met during his time in Groningen, in 2015. Dourisseau stayed in Groningen after his professional basketball career.

Honors

Trophies

 KR
Úrvalsdeild (1): 2008–09
Icelandic Company Cup (1): 2008
Donar
Dutch Basketball League (5): 2009–10, 2013–14, 2015–16, 2016–17, 2017–18
NBB Cup (4): 2010–11, 2013–14, 2016–17, 2017–18
Dutch Basketball Supercup (2): 2015, 2018

Awards

Donar
DBL Most Valuable Player (1): 2010–11
All-DBL Team (1): 2010–11
DBL Best Defender of the Year (2): 2012–13, 2013–14
DBL All-Star (4): 2011, 2012, 2013, 2014
DBL All-Defense Team (2): 2014, 2017
Icelandic All-Star Game MVP: 2009
Icelandic All-Star: 2009

References

External links

1983 births
Living people
American men's basketball players
American expatriate basketball people in Germany
American expatriate basketball people in Iceland
American expatriate basketball people in the Netherlands
Basketball players from Nebraska
Donar (basketball club) players
Dutch Basketball League players
Dutch men's basketball players
KR men's basketball players
Nebraska Cornhuskers men's basketball players
Small forwards
S.Oliver Würzburg players
Sportspeople from Omaha, Nebraska
Úrvalsdeild karla (basketball) players
Aris Leeuwarden players